West Germany competed at the 1968 Summer Paralympics in Tel Aviv, Israel. The team finished sixth in the medal table and won a total of thirty-five medals; twelve gold, twelve silver and eleven bronze.

See also 
 West Germany at the 1968 Summer Olympics

References

Nations at the 1968 Summer Paralympics
1968
Paralympics